Nahant Beach Boulevard, also Nahant Causeway and Nahant Road is a historic road on the isthmus connecting Nahant, Massachusetts to the mainland at Lynn, Massachusetts. It passes through Nahant Beach Reservation, a state park offering beach access on the isthmus. The road offers expansive views of the area coastlines and Boston Harbor. Both the park and the roadway are administered by the Massachusetts Department of Conservation and Recreation.

Nahant Beach Boulevard was first laid out in 1905, as part of the Metropolitan District Commission's program of developing oceanfront parkways, and provided the first paved road access to Nahant. It was designed by the firm of Olmsted, Olmsted, and Eliot, predecessor to the Olmsted Brothers landscape design firm. Around the same time, rail access and a bridle path were also added to the isthmus.

In 1936 that roadway alignment was converted into a parking area, and the present roadway was completed the following year on the alignment of the railroad bed. The Lynn Rotary was completed in 1935. This work, along with the conversion of the bridle path to a promenade, was paid for by Works Progress Administration grants. Since then modifications to the roadway have been modest. Seawalls have been built, a chain link fence was installed on the wall between the road and the parking lot, and the rotary was landscaped.

When the roadway was listed on the National Register of Historic Places in 2003, the designation included, in addition to the roadway itself, the Lynn Rotary and the Spanish–American War Memorial located in the rotary; a second memorial, the Aliferis Monument, postdates the period of significance for the listing.

See also
 National Register of Historic Places listings in Lynn, Massachusetts
 National Register of Historic Places listings in Essex County, Massachusetts

References

Roads on the National Register of Historic Places in Massachusetts
Parkways in Massachusetts
Transportation in Essex County, Massachusetts
National Register of Historic Places in Essex County, Massachusetts
Historic districts on the National Register of Historic Places in Massachusetts
Parks on the National Register of Historic Places in Massachusetts
National Register of Historic Places in Lynn, Massachusetts